Shahzadi Khanam (21 November 1569 – ?) was a Mughal princess, the second surviving child and eldest daughter of Mughal Emperor Akbar.

Family 
Born on 21 November 1569, Shahzadi was the eldest daughter of the Mughal Emperor Akbar. Her mother was a royal concubine named Bibi Salima (not to be confused with Salima Sultan Begum). When Akbar reached Gwalior, he received the news of her birth. He named her Shahzadi Khanam and ordered rejoicings. She was placed under the care of her grandmother, Mariam Makani.

She was well respected by her older half-brother, Jahangir who remarked – "Among all my sisters, in integrity, truth, and zeal for my welfare, she is without her equal; but her time is principally devoted to the worship of her creator."

She deeply grieved the death of her mother, Bibi Salima on 13 May 1599. Akbar "soothed her somewhat by sympathy and counsels."

Marriage 
On late September 1593, Shahzada was married to Prince Muzaffar Husain Mirza, son of Prince Ibrahim Husain Mirza, a descendant of Prince Umar Shaikh Mirza, second son of Amir Timur. His mother was Gulrukh Begum, daughter of Kamran Mirza, son of the first Mughal Emperor Babur. Her brother, Jahangir, had already earlier been married to a sister of Muzaffar Husain, Nur-un-Nissa Begum.

Reference 

Mughal princesses
1569 births
16th-century Indian women
17th-century Indian women